Czechoslovakia competed at the 1932 Summer Olympics in Los Angeles, United States. Because of the ongoing Great Depression and high costs for the trip to Los Angeles, the Czechoslovak state refused to sponsor the trip, but the 7 best athletes still participated in events with the help of street fundraising. Those 7 athletes were very successful, with the majority gaining medals, including weightlifter Jaroslav Skobla, who won gold.

Medalists

References
Official Olympic Reports
International Olympic Committee results database
Czech Olympic Report

Nations at the 1932 Summer Olympics
1932
Summer Olympics